In Love with Love is a surviving 1924 American silent comedy film directed by Rowland V. Lee and produced and distributed by the Fox Film Corporation. It starred Marguerite De La Motte. The film is based on the 1923 Broadway play In Love with Love by Vincent Lawrence which starred Lynn Fontanne, Henry Hull, and Ralph Morgan.

Plot
As described in a review in a film magazine, Ann Jordan (De La Motte), the flirtatious and pampered daughter of a wealthy contractor (Walling), is inclined to favor easy going Bob (Goodwin), but breezy and conceited Frank (Sears) sweeps her off her feet and she becomes engaged to him. Shaking his hand, her father remarks that he is the thirteenth suitor he has congratulated for that reason. Bob's friend Jack (Forrest), an engineer, is preparing a design for a bridge competition. Ann's father becomes interested, invites him to the house, and copies his ideas. Ann falls in love with Jack and sweeps him off his feet, although he realizes that she is a flirt. Ann's father congratulates him on his engagement, and declares that he is responsible for Jack losing the bridge competition as he wanted the design for a bigger proposition.

Cast

Preservation
The Library of Congress holds a print of this film; a nitrate from Czech film archive (cataloged under its Czech title Co Laska Natropi!).

References

External links

Lobby poster

1924 films
American silent feature films
Films directed by Rowland V. Lee
Fox Film films
American films based on plays
American black-and-white films
1924 comedy films
Silent American comedy films
1920s American films